Admiral Moe Aung (born  1966) is a Burmese military officer. After the 2021 Myanmar coup d'état, Moe Aung was appointed as the commander-in-chief of the Myanmar Navy, succeeding Tin Aung San, who became a member of the State Administration Council, the military junta.

Military career 
Moe Aung graduated from the 28th intake of the Defence Services Academy. On 20 February 2023, the European Union imposed sanctions on Moe Aung for human rights violations and undermining democracy and rule of law in the country.

Personal life 
Moe Aung is married to Aye Khine Nyunt. His father Aung Thaung was a high-ranking Burmese military officer. The Aung Thaung family has significant business interests in the country, including United Amara Bank.

See also 

 2021–2023 Myanmar civil war
 State Administration Council
 Tatmadaw

References 

Living people
Burmese generals
Defence Services Academy alumni
Year of birth missing (living people)
Individuals related to Myanmar sanctions